The American Collegiate Athletic Association men's basketball tournament was the annual conference basketball championship tournament for the NCAA Division III American Collegiate Athletic Association. The tournament was held annually from the conference's foundation in 2018 until its dissolution after the 2019–20 season. It was a single-elimination tournament and seeding was based on regular season records.

The winner, while declared conference champion, never received an automatic bid to the NCAA Men's Division III Basketball Championship.

Results

Championship records

 Schools highlighted in pink departed the ACAA before its dissolution.
UC Santa Cruz, Finlandia, Pratt, SUNY Canton, Thomas More, and Valley Forage never qualified for the finals as ACAA members

References

NCAA Division III men's basketball conference tournaments
Basketball, Men's, Tournament
Recurring sporting events established in 2018
Recurring sporting events disestablished in 2020